Derrick Mensah (born 28 May 1995) is a Ghanaian professional football player who plays as a defensive midfielder.

Mensah started his professional career with Tema Youth before moving to Club Africain in 2013. Following a contract squabble which led to him leaving the club as a free agent, he joined FC Baník Ostrava in 2014.

Derrick Mensah has played international football at under-20 level for Ghana.

Playing career

Club career

Tema Youth 
Mensah started his career with Tema Youth. He scored his first senior professional goal against Ebusua Dwarfs on 24 October 2012. The club were relegated that season.

Club Africain  
Following Tema Youth's relegation from the top tier of Ghanaian football, the club decided that they would sell all their players to make way for new players. Mensah moved to Tunisian side Club Africain. He left the Tunisian side without playing a single professional game for them following allegations of salary problems which saw him terminating his contract.

Baník Ostrava 
After failing to obtain a contract with Atlético Madrid, he trialed with Czech side Ostrava but almost failed due to language problems. Despite the problems he has impressed enough for the club to offer him a contract. However, his former club Africain took the matter to FIFA and delayed the transfer. Another factor was the late issuance of the International Transfer Certificate. However, he eventually  signed for the club. He made his debut against FK Jablonec as a substitute in the 74th minute in which his team suffered a 1–0 defeat.

Haugesund 

Mensah signed for Haugesund in January 2016 on a three-year deal.

Aluminij 

Mensah signed for Slovenian club Aluminij on 27 January 2017.

International career
Mensah was selected for the U-20 African Youth Championship in Algeria, for the tournament's 2013 edition. He played two games at the tournament.

Personal
Mensah views Milan Baroš as a role model.

References

External links
 

1995 births
Living people
Ghanaian footballers
Ghanaian expatriate footballers
Association football midfielders
Tema Youth players
FC Baník Ostrava players
Club Africain players
FK Haugesund players
MFK Karviná players
NK Aluminij players
FC Dunav Ruse players
1. SC Znojmo players
AC Kajaani players
Czech First League players
Eliteserien players
Slovenian PrvaLiga players
First Professional Football League (Bulgaria) players
Czech National Football League players
Ykkönen players
Expatriate footballers in Tunisia
Ghanaian expatriate sportspeople in Tunisia
Expatriate footballers in Bulgaria
Ghanaian expatriate sportspeople in Bulgaria
Expatriate footballers in Slovenia
Ghanaian expatriate sportspeople in Slovenia
Expatriate footballers in Norway
Ghanaian expatriate sportspeople in Norway
Expatriate footballers in the Czech Republic
Ghanaian expatriate sportspeople in the Czech Republic
Expatriate footballers in Finland
Ghanaian expatriate sportspeople in Finland